The Hobart Area Transportation Study was a comprehensive transport plan released in 1965 for the purpose of examining the transport needs of the Australian Hobart metropolitan area over the proceeding 20 years. The study predicted the majority of the proposed traffic corridors would need to be operational by the 1985 target year.

Ultimately, the majority of the study's recommendations were brought to fruition in some form or another. Sections of Hobart's three major radial highways—the Tasman Highway (Tasman Bridge to Airport), the Brooker Highway (North of Berriedale) and the Southern Outlet—were influenced in their construction by the study's recommendations for grade-separated, limited-access freeway designs.

History
From the advent of the Motor vehicle to the sixties, the number of vehicles registered had increased to almost 40,000 in the Hobart Area. The influx of motor vehicles in and around Hobart placed great Burdon on the road system as it then existed.

In 1963, the Department of Public Works, the Transport Commission and Hobart City Council initiated the first urban transportation study conducted in Australia. The Study was undertaken by US transportation and infrastructure consulting firm Wilbur Smith and Associates during the years 1963 and 1964, and the findings and suggestions were published in 1965.

Application
The Hobart Area Transport study area was to encompass Hobart's estimated metropolitan boundary in 1985 which extended as far as Granton in the north; Sorell to the east; Howrah to the south east; and Kingston to the south west.

The study was engaged through detailed surveys from the public, analysing traffic statistics and analysing past traffic trends, in an attempt to predict traffic patterns in Hobart with a target year of 1985 – 20 years from the time of publication.

Publication of the Study
The Hobart area Transportation Study proposed the construction of four Freeways and one Expressway, a significant upgrade and expansion of the Brooker Highway, a duplication of the Tasman Bridge, the possible creation of an additional crossing of the River Derwent  and several smaller projects within the Hobart CBD. The study also encouraged greater use of roads through public and private transport and discouraged the use of Hobart's passenger train services as a primary mode of Transport in the city. The study acknowledged the capital costs of the proposed Freeways would be too much for the Tasmanian government to undertake alone, but suggested the possibility of Australian Government assistance if pursued. The study was composed of the following principle segments:

Estimates
The Hobart Area Transportation study was also released with estimates of daily Traffic of the proposals for the Target year of 1985.

See also
Hobart Bypass
Transport in Hobart
Southern Transport Investment Program

Melbourne:
 1969 Melbourne Transportation Plan

Adelaide:
 Metropolitan Adelaide Transport Study - analogous 1968 transport plan.

References

External links
Tasmanian Expressways

Proposed transport infrastructure in Australia
Transport in Hobart
History of Hobart
Government reports
1965 in Australia
1965 documents